Juan Mbo Ondo (born 13 January 1991), sportingly known as Helguera, is an Equatoguinean footballer who plays as a centre-back for Futuro Kings FC. He was a member of the Equatorial Guinea national team.

He received his nickname as a tribute to former Real Madrid defender Iván Helguera.

Club career
Born in Ebibeyin, Kié-Ntem, Helguera emigrated to Malabo, the Equatoguinean capital. There he played for Atlético Malabo for two seasons, then was transferred to cross-town rival Sony de Elá Nguema.

International career
In October 2008, Helguera was called-up by the national team for a 2010 FIFA World Cup qualifier match against South Africa. He was an unused substitute in that game. Helguera made his international debut with the national team on 28 March 2009 in a 0–5 friendly loss to Cape Verde in Espargos.

References

External links

1991 births
Living people
People from Ebibeyin
Equatoguinean footballers
Association football central defenders
CD Elá Nguema players
Futuro Kings FC players
Equatorial Guinea international footballers